Vershina is a rural locality (a village) in Krasnoborsky District, Arkhangelsk Oblast, Russia. The population was 80 as of 2010.

Geography 
Vershina is located 27 km east of Krasnoborsk (the district's administrative centre) by road. Fominskaya is the nearest rural locality.

References 

Rural localities in Krasnoborsky District